Blanket High School or Blanket School is a public high school located in Blanket, Texas (USA) and classified as a 1A school by the UIL. It is part of the Blanket Independent School District located in eastern Brown County. In 2015, the school was rated "Met Standard" by the Texas Education Agency.

Athletics
The Blanket Tigers compete in these sports - 

Basketball
Cross Country
6-Man Football
Golf
Tennis
Track

See also

List of high schools in Texas
List of Six-man football stadiums in Texas

References

External links
Blanket ISD website

Public high schools in Texas
Brown